Patrick D. Mehigan (17 March 1884 – 4 December 1965) was an Irish sportsperson and journalist.  Born in Ardfield, County Cork, he played hurling with Robert Emmets GAA and with the London senior inter-county team in the early 1900s.  Mehigan later served as the leading Gaelic games journalist from the 1920s until the 1940s.  He wrote several histories of the Gaelic Athletic Association and was correspondent for the Cork Examiner under the pseudonym Carbery.  Mehigan also wrote for The Irish Times under the byline Pato.

1884 births
1965 deaths
Cork hurlers
Gaelic games journalists
Irish Examiner people
Irish sports journalists
London inter-county hurlers
Robert Emmett's (London) hurlers
The Irish Times people